Tympanocryptis is a genus of Australian lizards in the family Agamidae commonly known as earless dragons.

Description
The genus Tympanocryptis has the following characters. The tympanum is hidden (hence the common name earless dragon). The body is depressed, and it is covered dorsally with heterogeneous scales. There is no dorsal crest. There is no gular sac, but a strong transverse gular fold is present. The tail is round in cross section. There is a preanal pore on each side, which sometimes is absent in females. In most species there are no femoral pores, Tympanocryptis tetraporophora being an exception.

Species
The following 23 species are recognized as being valid.

Tympanocryptis argillosa  – claypan earless dragon
Tympanocryptis centralis  – central Australian earless dragon
Tympanocryptis cephalus  – blotch-tailed earless dragon
Tympanocryptis condaminensis  – Condamine earless dragon (previously part of T. pinguicolla)
Tympanocryptis diabolicus  – Hamersley pebble-mimic dragon 
Tympanocryptis fictilis  – Harlequin earless dragon
Tympanocryptis fortescuensis  – Fortescue pebble-mimic dragon
Tympanocryptis gigas  –  Gascoyne pebble-mimic dragon 
Tympanocryptis houstoni  – Houston's earless dragon
Tympanocryptis intima  – gibber earless dragon
Tympanocryptis lineata  – lined earless dragon or Canberra grassland earless dragon (Canberra population previously part of T. pinguicolla)
Tympanocryptis macra – savannah earless dragon
Tympanocryptis mccartneyi  – Bathurst grassland earless dragon  (previously part of T. pinguicolla)
Tympanocryptis osbornei  – Monaro grassland earless dragon  (previously part of T. pinguicolla)
Tympanocryptis pentalineata  – five-lined earless dragon
Tympanocryptis petersi  – lined earless dragon
Tympanocryptis pinguicolla  – Victorian grassland earless dragon (possibly extinct)
Tympanocryptis pseudopsephos   – Goldfields pebble-mimic dragon 
Tympanocryptis rustica  – Tennant Creek pebble dragon
Tympanocryptis tetraporophora  – long-tailed earless dragon
Tympanocryptis tolleyi  – Gawler earless dragon
Tympanocryptis uniformis  – even-scaled earless dragon
Tympanocryptis wilsoni  – Roma earless dragon (previously part of T. pinguicolla)

The "grassland earless dragons"
Several members of the T. lineata species complex (namely the Canberra population of T. lineata, T. mccartneyi, T. osbornei, and T. pinguicolla) are referred to as the "grassland earless dragons", being the only members of the family Agamidae to be restricted to natural temperate grasslands. These species are found at higher altitudes and in regions that have cooler temperatures than any other earless dragon, where they prefer sites with both taller tussock and shorter grasses. The species were formerly considered different isolated populations of T. pinguicolla, until a 2019 study found the Canberra population to actually be an isolated eastern population of T. lineata and the Cooma and Bathurst populations to represent distinct species, and thus restricted the definition of T. pinguicolla to refer to only the possibly-extinct Victorian population.

The grassland earless dragons lay 3-6 eggs in late spring or early summer. Their young hatch in late summer (possibly disperse soon after hatching), grow to adult size rapidly (by late autumn-early winter), mate the following spring, and often die within one year of birth. They can reach the age of 5 within captivity.

All of the grassland earless dragons are highly endangered due to the heavy destruction and conversion of the temperate grasslands, of which less than 1% are said to remain. Overgrazing poses one of the most significant threats to them, especially when rocks are disturbed. These species are rarely found outside native temperate grasslands, and does not adapt well to changed environments, primarily due to the lack of food diversity found outside their native habitat. T. pinguicolla may already be extinct due to the heavy degradation that grasslands have received in Victoria, with the last known confirmed sighting being made in 1969.

According to herpetologist Lyn S. Nelson, "Observations indicate that arthropod burrows, surface rocks, or other similar refuge sites may be necessary for the continued persistence of populations of dragons, by providing thermal refugia." They are known to hide within abandoned arthropod burrows and underneath rocky outcrops in order to lay eggs and protect themselves from predators. Soil disturbance, such as ploughing or compaction, might also result in destruction of the essential arthropod burrows and possibly a reduction in the abundance, at least in the short-term, of burrow forming arthropods. A radio-tracking study found that "burrows excavated by arthropods are an important resource for grassland earless dragons, with individuals having one or two home burrows around which they maintained home ranges of between 925 m2 and 4768 m2." According to Nelson, they "[m]ay survive short-term disturbance from fire."

In early January 2014, media reported that researchers Professor Stephen Sarre and Dr Lisa Doucette from the University of Canberra's Institute for Applied Ecology had succeeded in breeding the Canberran T. lineata in captivity, and had also hatched eggs gathered from field studies, with around 60 hatchlings being born. In June 2011, Professor Sarre's team won a four-year funding grant from the Australian Research Council to research and potentially save the species from extinction, and find a cause for the species recent collapse in numbers, thought to be associated with 10 years of drought in the species' range. In 2019, ecologist Brett Howard from the ACT Parks and Conservation Service said that "grassland earless dragons are at risk of extinction in the near future even though much has been done to improve their survival chances in the past five years." He then listed the threats posed to this species, saying "this species has suffered declines in recent decades likely due to a combination of drought, overgrazing and climate change.”

References

External links
Tympanocryptis. Zipcode Zoo.

Grassland Earless Dragon.

Further reading
Peters W (1863). "Eine Übersicht der von Hrn. Richard Schomburgk an das zoologische Museum eingesandten Amphibien, aus Buchsfelde bei Adelaide in Südaustralien ". Monatsberichte der Königlichen Preussischen Akademie der Wissenschaften zu Berlin 1863: 228-236. (Tympanocryptis, new genus, p. 230). (in German).

Tympanocryptis
Lizard genera
Agamid lizards of Australia
Taxa named by Wilhelm Peters